Amorphoscelis chopardi is a species of praying mantis found in Côte d'Ivoire and Ghana.

References

Amorphoscelis
Mantodea of Africa
Insects described in 1962